Ioannis Kontoyiannis (born January 1972) is a Greek mathematician and information theorist. He is the Churchill Professor of Mathematics for Operational Research with the Statistical Laboratory, in the Department of Pure Mathematics and Mathematical Statistics, of the University of Cambridge. He is also a Fellow of Darwin College, Cambridge, an affiliated member of the Division of Information Engineering, Cambridge, a Research Fellow of the Foundation for Research and Technology - Hellas, a Senior Member of Robinson College, Cambridge, and a trustee of the Rollo Davidson Trust.

His research interests are in information theory, probability and statistics, including their applications in data compression, bioinformatics, neuroscience, machine learning, and the connections between core information-theoretic ideas and results in probability theory and additive combinatorics.

Academic biography 
Kontoyiannis earned a B.S. in mathematics from Imperial College, University of London (1992), he obtained a distinction in Part III of the Cambridge University Pure Mathematics Tripos (1993), and he earned an M.S. in statistics (1997) and a Ph.D. in electrical engineering (1998), both from Stanford University. Between 1998 and 2018 he taught at Purdue University, Brown University, Columbia University, and at the Athens University of Economics and Business. In January 2018 he joined the Information Engineering Division at Cambridge University, as Professor of Information and Communications, and Head of the Signal Processing and Communications Laboratory. Since June 2020 he has been with the Statistical Laboratory, in the Department of Pure Mathematics and Mathematical Statistics, University of Cambridge, where he holds the Churchill Chair in Mathematics.

Awards and honors 

 Manning endowed assistant professorship (2002)
 Alfred P. Sloan Foundation Research Fellowship (2004)
 Honorary Master of Arts Degree Ad Eundem, Brown University (2005)
 Marie Curie Fellowship (2009)
 IEEE Fellow (2011)

References

External links 
Ioannis Kontoyiannis' web page at Cambridge

1972 births
Living people
Information theorists
Fellows of Darwin College, Cambridge
Alumni of Imperial College London
Greek expatriates in the United Kingdom
Stanford University alumni
Greek expatriates in the United States
Purdue University faculty
Brown University faculty
Columbia University faculty
Sloan Fellows
Fellow Members of the IEEE
20th-century Greek mathematicians
21st-century Greek mathematicians
Engineering professors at the University of Cambridge